Jadambi Mandal was an Indian politician. He was a Member of Parliament, representing Bihar in the Rajya Sabha the upper house of India's Parliament as a member of the Rashtriya Janata Dal.

References

Rajya Sabha members from Bihar
1929 births
Rashtriya Janata Dal politicians
2000 deaths
Janata Dal politicians